Srđan Ćuković (born 31 March 1952 in Belgrade) is a Serbian poet and composer.

Early days 
Ćuković was born to a Serbian father, university professor Dr. Milan Ćuković, and to Branislava Ćuković. His grandfather's surname was Ćuk, but in 1922 the grandfather changed it to Ćuković.

He was introduced to accordion after injuring his arm in a car accident at age eight. Unwilling to learn notes, led his music teacher to suggest guitar to his parents. He got his first guitar in 1962, when his father bought him his first single Beatles record. He was beginning to write poetry and learn English, mostly to sing songs by favorites such as The Beatles, Hollies, Bob Dylan, Donovan, Kinks, Rolling Stones, Beach boys. He often jokes saying that he learned English by listening to Beatles and Radio Luxembourg.

As a secondary school student he was introduced to a journalist, chess grandmaster and radio DJ Nikola Karaklajić, who sought out young musicians and had good knowledge of English and access to many recordings.

Ćuković started as a songwriter and performer for the play 'The Punks''',performed by the Dadov Youth Theatre from Belgrade, directed by Radomir Putnik and managed by Mihailo Tošić. His original score for the play won his first award on the Youth Theatre festival in Kula, 1970.

 Career 
Ćuković enrolled at Belgrade University, Faculty of Law; graduating in 1976 to begin working for the largest Yugoslav trading company of that time Generalexport / Genex. He was appointed as representative to the office in Sweden 1984 – 1989.

In Sweden he spent much of his free time in writing poetry and composing music.

 Studio, festivals 
In 1986 he met two musicians from Yugoslavia: pianist and music producer Bratislav Bata Amvon and guitarist and music producer Tinnie Varga. In his apartment Ćuković built a 4 channel recording studio. The three recorded Ćuković songs as demo takes. Ćuković returned to Belgrade and invested his savings into a studio ’he named ’'Triler’’, working with musician and producer Dragomir Miki Stanojević and Branislav Bane Bojadžievski. The studio operated from 1990 until 1997. He wrote songs and recorded them with many singers. He attended competitive festivals including 'Beogradsko proleće’, ’Mesam’ and ’Yugovizija' (Eurovision Song Contest preliminary), 'Manager' and 'Budva'), sometimes winning. Singers such as Miša Ždrnja, Sunčica Knežević and Igor Pervić started their singing careers singing Ćuković songs. Bands including Spomenari, Maja Pop-Top also used his material. Bulgarian singer Violeta Vili Rai represented television Priština on last Yugovizija with Ćuković’s song and made an LP material with Ćuković’s songs. Svetlana Ceca Slavković was a singer who was discovered by Ćuković. Together they won a couple of festival first prizes.

 "A poem about father" 
In spring 1995, Ćuković wrote a song that somehow ended his public career. The festival was ‘Manager 1995’. Ćuković asked actors Suzana Petričević and Marko Nikolić to perform and wrote an anti-war song for them; implicating Yugoslavia's late president Tito and the war under the regime of Slobodan Milošević, ending with ‘’Pardon us God’’. This song ‘’A poem about father’’ was the winner in the Sava Center contest. The political regime in Serbia objected. The song was never recorded and all known copies were destroyed. The only surviving copy was one that was recorded on a home VCR. Ćuković was silenced for many years afterwards.

Bezuha’s blues band Zona B recorded a song devoted to Serbian tennis player Novak Djoković called ‘’Joker’’ for which Ćuković wrote English lyrics. Bezuha arranged and produced many Ćuković songs, with Ćuković singing. In 2013 he finalized more than twenty new songs; arranged and produced by Bratislav Bata Amvon or Dušan Duda Bezuha.

 Author, poet 
In 2004 Cuković released a book of poetry, In pursuit for colorful galaxy, marketed with a CD containing most of his famous songs. One of the songs was "Poem about father" that Ćuković’s friend, guitar player and producer Dušan Duda Bezuha mastered from old VHS tape. Belgrade singer Ana Djordjević recorded one of Ćuković’s early songs and made a promo video both in Serbian and English (Ćuković wrote lyrics for English version too) with a new arrangement by Duda Bezuha.

In 2013 his second book of poetry and essays, Dreams to take away (Snovi za poneti), was published. His poem "Embrace life"("Zagrli zivot")  was including in the International Anthology of Poetry for Children published by the Association of Balkan writers in 2014. He is mentioned in the Monograph "Spirit of Dadov" ("Duh Dadova"), published by Youth Theatre DADOV. His third book of essays and poetry Amo, Ergo Sum was published in 2016. His fourth book of essays and poetry Život je pustolovina ograničenog trajanja(Life is an adventure of limited duration'') was published middle 2022, under number 978-86-917221-2-8 National Library of Serbia and many of the lyrics from it are on Youtube as composed-finished songs.

Style and influence 
Ćuković composed a blues, protest and folk-like songs. His singing is influenced by Leonard Cohen.

Affiliations 
Ćuković is a member of the writers society '’Miloš Crnjanski'’ in Stockholm. He became a member of the Serbian Association of Composers '’SOKOJ'’ in 1993. Ćuković joined The Association of Serbian Writers in 2014. Ćuković is a member of Association of Translators of Serbia since 1976

Personal life 
Ćuković lives in Belgrade with his third wife Sonja Antić.
Ćuković was married to his second wife Mirjana Karić. He has a daughter Iva from his first marriage with Dragoslava Vasić.

Discography

References

Sources 
 Srđan Ćuković na Discogs
 Biografija Cece Slavković
 Izdavačka kuća City Records
 Sokoj – lista autora sa pravima
 Zona B oficijelni sajt

External links 
 
 
 Vimeo Profile

1952 births
Living people
Serbian composers